The men's 20 kilometres walk event at the 1993 Summer Universiade was held in Buffalo, United States on 17 July 1993.

Results

References

Athletics at the 1993 Summer Universiade
1993